Heinz Kindermann (born 20 June 1942 in Welhotta, Reichsgau Sudetenland) is a German politician who served as a Member of the European Parliament from 1994 until 2009. He is a member of the Social Democratic Party of Germany, part of the Socialist Group.

In parliament, Kindermann served on the Committee on Agriculture and Rural Development and the Committee on Fisheries. He was also a member of the Delegation to the EU-Croatia Joint Parliamentary Committee and a substitute for the Delegation for relations with the countries of south-east Europe.

Career
 1956–1958: Farming apprenticeship
 1961–1967: Studied veterinary medicine

Education
 1968: Doctorate
 1967–1990: Veterinary doctor in a partnership in Strasburg
 1990: Specialist qualification for small animals
 1990–1994: Veterinary official in Strasburg
 1992: Passed the veterinary officers' civil service examination
 1992–1994: Head of the district veterinary and food supervisory office of Strasburg
 1991–1993: Chairman of Strasburg district SPD
 1991–1992: Head of the Human Justice and Culture of the Minorities
 1992–1995: Vice-Chairman of Uecker-Randow district SPD
 1990–1994: Municipal Councillor and SPD Group Chairman in Strasburg
 1994–2009: Member of the European Parliament

External links

1942 births
Living people
People from Litoměřice District
People from Sudetenland
Sudeten German people
Social Democratic Party of Germany MEPs
MEPs for Germany 2004–2009
MEPs for Germany 1994–1999
MEPs for Germany 1999–2004
Recipients of the Cross of the Order of Merit of the Federal Republic of Germany